The Jiaruipu Temple, also known as the Kanapo Temple, is a Makatao temple in Gaoshu Township, Pingtung County, Taiwan.

History 
The temple is in the northeast of Taishan Village, Gaoshu Township, located in a rural region.  It is the religious center for the local Makatao people.

On April 16, 2011, the Makatao of Gaoshu, Neipu, and Wanluan conducted a protest at the temple with the goal of lobbying the Republic of China's Council of Indigenous Peoples to recognize them as Plains Aborigines, and established Makatao Association.

Name 
The temple name was 'A-mu House'(阿姆寮), but the Siraya people renamed it to Gongxie(公廨).

References 

Temples in Pingtung County
Taoist temples in Taiwan